is a railway station on the Iida Line in Tenryū-ku, Hamamatsu, Shizuoka Prefecture, Japan, operated by Central Japan Railway Company (JR Central).

Lines
Kowada Station is served by the Iida Line and is 83.8 kilometers from the starting point of the line at Toyohashi Station.

Station layout
The station has one ground-level side platform serving a single bi-directional track, with a small wooden station building. Until 2008, the station had dual opposed side platforms, but one platform has since been discontinued. The station is not attended.

Adjacent stations

History
Kowada Station was established on December 30, 1936, as the terminal station of the now-defunct Sanshin Railway. On August 1, 1943, the Sanshin Railway was nationalized along with several other local lines to form the Iida line. All freight services were discontinued in December 1971 and the station has been unmanned since February 1984. Along with the division and privatization of JNR on April 1, 1987, the station came under the control and operation of the Central Japan Railway Company.

Passenger statistics
In fiscal 2016, the station was used by an average of 8 passengers daily (boarding passengers only).

Surrounding area
The station is located in an isolated area near the border of Shizuoka Prefecture with Nagano and Aichi and is not accessible by road. The nearest road (towards Sakuma Dam) is a 40- to 50-minute walk.

See also
 List of railway stations in Japan

References

External links

Iida Line station information 

Stations of Central Japan Railway Company
Iida Line
Railway stations in Japan opened in 1936
Railway stations in Shizuoka Prefecture
Railway stations in Hamamatsu